Johann Georg von Hahn (11 July 1811 – 23 September 1869) was an Austrian and later Austro-Hungarian diplomat, philologist and specialist in Albanian history, language and culture.

Hahn was born in Frankfurt am Main.  In 1847, he was named Austrian consul in Ioannina, today in Greece. He was transferred to the Hellenic Kingdom on the island of Syros in 1851, and from 1869 was the consul-general in Athens.  He is considered the founder of Albanian studies. He assembled and published source materials on Albanian language and culture as descendants of ancient Illyrians.
His published works:
 Albanesische Studien. 3 vols. Jena: F. Mauko, 1854; Vienna: Hof- und Staatsdruckerei, 1853 (reprint Dion.Karavias, Athen 1981)
 Reise von Belgrad nach Salonik. Vienna: K. K. Consul für östliche Griechenland, 1861.
 Griechische und albanesische Märchen. 2 vols. Leipzig: 1864; Munich/Berlin 1918 – as ebook and several Google Books scans at archive.org
 Reise durch die Gebiete von Drin und Wardar. Vienna: 1867.
 Contes populaires grecs   Free Google eBook (1879). A.-F. Høst, ed.

Books about him:

Gerhard Grimm, "Johann Georg von Hahn (1811-1869) - Leben und Werk", Wiesbaden 1964

External links 
 Biography of Johann Georg von Hahn on the website of Robert Elsie

This article draws heavily on the corresponding article in the German-language Wikipedia.

1811 births
1869 deaths
Austrian philologists
Albanologists
Austrian diplomats
Writers from Frankfurt
19th-century diplomats
19th-century philologists